Planet FM was a private radio station in Mauritius. It began operation on May 2, 2019 with a Private Commercial Free to Air FM Radio Broadcasting Licence issued by the Independent Broadcasting Authority-Mauritius. On a letter dated 3 August 2020, the Independent Broadcasting Authority (Mauritius) revoked the licence of the radio for non-compliance with the Information and Communication Technologies Act 2001.

Planet Fm's slogan was "Mauritius and The World" (French: Maurice et le monde).

See also
List of radio stations in Mauritius

References

External links
 

Radio stations in Mauritius
Radio stations established in 2019